State Route 158 (SR 158) is a state highway in the U.S. state of California. Known as the June Lake Loop, it is a loop route of U.S. Route 395 in Mono County that serves the community of June Lake.

Route description
The route is a loop west off of U.S. Route 395 passing through the community of June Lake, following the watercourse of June Lake, Gull Lake, Reversed Creek, Silver Lake, Rush Creek and Grant Lake, into the Mono Basin. The highway provides access to several vacation areas, trailheads, and scenic locations, including the June Mountain ski and snowboard resort.

SR 158 is not part of the National Highway System, a network of highways that are considered essential to the country's economy, defense, and mobility by the Federal Highway Administration.

Major intersections

See also

References

External links

California @ AARoads.com - State Route 158
Caltrans: Route 158 highway conditions
California Highways: Route 158

158
State Route 158
Inyo National Forest